The 13th Independent Michigan Light Artillery Battery was an artillery battery that served in the Union Army during the American Civil War.

Service
Battery "M"  was organized at Grand Rapids, Michigan, and mustered into service on January 20, 1864. The battery was mounted and used to fight guerrillas and on patrol duty on February 27, 1865.

The battery was mustered out on July 1, 1865.

Total strength and casualties
Over its existence, the battery carried a total of 257 men on its muster rolls.

The battery 1 enlisted man killed in action or mortally wounded and 13 enlisted men who died of disease, for a total of 14
fatalities.

Commanders
Captain Callahan O'Riordan

See also
List of Michigan Civil War Units
Michigan in the American Civil War

Notes

References
The Civil War Archive

Artillery
1865 disestablishments in Michigan
M
1864 establishments in Michigan
Military units and formations established in 1864
Military units and formations disestablished in 1865